The Partridge Family Notebook is the sixth studio album by The Partridge Family. Released in November 1972, the album entered Billboard's Top LP's chart in December, peaking at no. 41 in January 1973 – the same week in which its lead single, a cover of Barry Mann and Cynthia Weil's "Looking Through the Eyes of Love", peaked at 39 on Billboard's  Hot 100. The album remained in the Top 200 for 16 weeks, and was the first by the Partridge Family not to reach the Top 40.

A second US single, "Friend and a Lover", was released in March 1973 but stalled at no. 99 on the Hot 100.

The Partridges' version of "Looking Through the Eyes of Love" – originally a hit for Gene Pitney in 1965 (US 28/UK 3) – fared better in the UK, where it peaked at no. 9 in late February and early March, at the height of both the glam rock era and David Cassidy's career as a teen idol solo star in Great Britain and Ireland. The single, which shared the Top Ten with glam giants Slade, the Sweet and Gary Glitter, immediately followed Cassidy's solo hit "Rock Me Baby" in the charts (UK no. 11/US 38) and slightly overlapped with Cassidy's next UK solo hit, the double A-side single "I Am a Clown / Some Kind of A Summer" (UK no. 3), which was not released in the States.

Notebook also featured a cover of "Walking in the Rain" – a 1964 Ronettes classic also by Barry Mann and Cynthia Weil, but co-written with Phil Spector. The Partridges' cover, which was not released as a single in America, reached no. 10 in the UK in June 1973. The album did not chart in the UK despite yielding two hit singles there.

The Notebook album cover was designed to resemble a standard school notebook. The cover of the UK and Europe album releases, as with the CD reissue many years later, featured a picture of the family in their usual red velvet suits.

Track listing
All tracks, except "Take Good Care of Her", "We Gotta Get Out Of This Place" and "Something's Wrong", were featured on the TV show (mainly from Season 3)

Personnel
David Cassidy - lead vocals
Dennis Budimir, Larry Carlton, Louie Shelton, Tommy Tedesco - guitar
Joe Osborn, Max Bennett - bass
Larry Knechtel, Mike Melvoin - keyboards
Hal Blaine - drums
Bahler Brothers, Jackie Ward, Ron Hicklin, Shirley Jones - background vocals
Jerry Whitman (tracks: A1, A2, A6), Tom Bahler (tracks: A1, A2, A6) - uncredited background vocals

Recording dates

May 1, 1972
"Take Good Care of Her"
"Together We're Better"
"Looking Through the Eyes of Love"
"We Gotta Get Outta This Place"
"Love Must Be the Answer"
"Something's Wrong"

September 4, 1972
"Storybook Love"
"As Long as You're There"

September 22, 1972
"Friend and a Lover"
"Walking in the Rain"
"Maybe Someday"

See recording dates for this and other Partridge Family albums at The Partridge Family Recording Sessions

Charts

Album

Singles

References

The Partridge Family albums
1972 albums
Bell Records albums
Albums produced by Wes Farrell